Nanowar of Steel (stylised as NanowaR of Steel by the band) is an Italian comedy heavy metal band. Their name is a pun on the metal bands Manowar and Rhapsody of Fire, and represents their tendency to satirize "true metal", the primary focus of their music. Their work mainly aims to make humorous references to and jokes about the genre, often parodying the way in which power metal bands are perceived to take themselves very seriously.

In 2006 the band changed their name from Nanowar to Nanowar of Steel, as a parody of the Italian power metal band Rhapsody changing their name to Rhapsody of Fire after a legal dispute. On their logo, the "of Steel" part was made to look like it was quickly and carelessly scribbled behind the main name as an afterthought.

History 

The 2005 album Other Bands Play, Nanowar Gay! was published on Jamendo under the Creative Commons-BY-NC-SA licence. The 2010 album Into Gay Pride Ride was published on the same platform under the Creative Commons-BY licence.

In April 2012 they released the videoclip for a new single entitled Giorgio Mastrota, which reached over 100,000 views on YouTube in just two weeks (currently over three and a half million). The song became extremely popular in Italy, being broadcast by several radio stations and also appearing on national television on several occasions. In 2013 they started cooperating with Feudalesimo e Liberta’, a well known Italian pseudo-parody political movement which advocates the return of the Empire and Feudal Rights in Europe. They released a music video in August of the same year, which was covered by mainstream newspapers (such as La Repubblica) and echoed through the whole Italian peninsula.

In July 2019 they released the song Norwegian Reggaeton. The video received 800,000 views on YouTube within the first 5 days, and 2.8 million views within the first month and is currently (March 2022) at over 10 million views. The song combines heavy metal and reggaeton and includes the collaboration of Charly Glamour, the singer/frontman of the similarly-themed parody heavy metal Spanish band Gigatron. The group performed Norwegian Reggaeton at Spanish television show Got Talent España; two of the four judges said "no", one of them before the band even started playing, after hearing the words "metal" and "reggaeton". Later the band announced their intention to represent Spain in the Eurovision Song Contest.

In December 2019, they released the song Valhallelujah, a Christmas song combining heavy metal and gospel, dedicated to Odin and IKEA. Angus McFife of Gloryhammer plays the part of Odin.

In May 2020, they released Sneeztem of a Yawn, a song about their lives during the COVID-19 pandemic in South Italy, with scrambled lyrics.

In early 2021, they announced a new album Italian Folk Metal, which was released on July 2, 2021. As the name suggests, the album combines folk music with metal music. Also, while they have released songs in Italian before, this is their first full-length album in the Italian language.

Members
Potowotominimak (Carlo Alberto Fiaschi) - lead vocals
Mr. Baffo (Raffaello Venditti) - co-lead vocals, miscellaneous sound effects
Mohammed Abdul (Valerio Storch) - guitars, keyboards, backing vocals
Gattopanceri666 (Edoardo Carlesi) - bass
Uinona Raider (Alessandro Milone) - drums, backing vocals

Discography

Studio albums

Compilation albums

Live albums

Extended plays

Singles

Music videos

See also
 Catarrhal Noise
 Massacration

References

External links
Official Website
NanowaR at Metal Storm
Nanowar MySpace

2003 establishments in Italy
Bands with fictional stage personas
Comedy rock musical groups
Italian heavy metal musical groups
Musical groups established in 2003
Musical quintets
Parody musicians
Italian parodists